Susan Carlson (born 1970) is an American former broadcast journalist and news anchor.

Early life and education
Susan Carlson was born in 1970 and grew up in Dolton, Illinois. She attended Seton Academy in South Holland, Illinois, before earning a Bachelor of Arts degree in journalism from Loyola University Chicago, where she graduated magna cum laude. She received a Master of Arts degree in journalism from Roosevelt University.

Career
Carlson began her career as a radio reporter and morning show anchor for WXLC and WKRS. She later became the news director of Shadow Traffic and broadcast news and traffic reports for WTMX, WILV, WJMK, and WSCR. She became a television traffic reporter for WGN-TV in Chicago in 1995 and worked there until 2002, when she took a job with WBBM-TV, eventually becoming co-anchor of the morning news. 

Carlson left WBBM in 2013 and took a position with WMAQ-TV, becoming an anchor for that station in 2014. She left WMAQ in 2020 and announced plans to become an audiobook narrator and voiceover artist.

References

1970 births
Living people
Television anchors from Chicago
Journalists from Illinois
Loyola University Chicago alumni
Roosevelt University alumni
People from Dolton, Illinois